This page is a list of paintings by the Dutch, or possibly Flemish, painter Matthias Stom.

Sicily

Province of Caltanissetta 

 17th century, cycle of paintings recorded inside the Palazzo Branciforti in Mazzarino.

Province of Catania

Catania 
From the Giovan Battista Finocchiaro collection in the Museo civico al Castello Ursino:
 Death of Cato
 Suicide of Seneca
 Death of Brutus
 Crucifixion of St Peter
 Tobias Healing his Blind Father
 Christ Mocked (I)
 Christ Mocked (II)

Linguaglossa 
 oil on canvas recorded in the Dominican 'aggregato'

Province of Messina

Messina
 1646 – 1649, Scaevola before Lars Porsena, Museo regionale di Messina.
 1646 – 1649, Adoration of the Shepherds, Museo Regionale di Messina.
 1646 – 1649, St Cecilia, recorded in the city's Capuchin monastery church.

Other
 1646 – 1649, Flagellation, museo civico polivalente «Egidio Ortolani» in Mistretta.

Province of Palermo

Caccamo 

 1641, Miracle of St Isidore the Laborer, oil on canvas, originally in the church of Sant'Agostino, stolen and recovered, now in the duomo di San Giorgio Martire.

Palermo 
 1638 – 1639, Flagellation, Oratorio del Rosario di San Domenico.
 c. 1638 – 1639, Christ Crowned with Thorns, attributed, Oratorio del Rosario di San Domenico.
 1639, The Stoning of St Stephen, oil on canvas, palazzo Alliata di Villafranca.
 1639, The Tribute Money or Miracle of the Tribute Money, oil on canvas, commissioned for the palazzo Alliata di Villafranca and recorded in the seminario arcivescovile.
 1646 – 1649, Man Blowing on an Ember, recorded in the Ruffo collection in Messina, now in the Galleria Regionale in palazzo Abatellis.
 Christ with the Doctors in the Temple and Jacob and Esau, recorded in Antonio Lucchesi-Palli's collection in Palazzo Campofranco.

Monreale 

 1640 – 1650, Last Supper, recorded in the sacristy of the basilica abbaziale di San Martino delle Scale.
 1646, Adoration of the Shepherds, commissioned and recorded in the Capuchin monastery church, now in the city's palazzo.
 17th century, St Dominic of Silos, recorded in the collegiate church of Santissimo Salvatore.

Province unknown 
 c. 1635, Isaac Blessing Jacob

Rest of Italy
 Christ Disputing with the Doctors in the Temple, oil on canvas, commissioned by Battistello Caracciolo, inherited and moved to Carafa, sold at auction. Version sold at Sotheby's New York.

Bergamo
 Assumption of the Virgin with St Sebastian, St Charles Borromeo and Saint Roch, church of Santa Maria Assunta in Chiuduno.

Liguria

Genoa
 Salome with the Head of John the Baptist and Death of Cato, Palazzo Bianco in Genoa.

Lombardy
 Last Judgement,  in Soncino.

Marche
 Burning of the Palazzo Ducale in Venice, Santissime Braccia Chapel in the basilica di San Nicola da Tolentino in Tolentino.

Naples

Capodimonte
 Adoration of the Shepherds
 Death of Seneca
 Supper at Emmaus

Other
 Flagellation, oil on canvas, chiesa di Sant'Eframo Nuovo dedicata alla «Santissima Concezione».
 Crucifixion with Angels, oil on canvas, chiesa di Sant'Eframo Nuovo dedicata alla «Santissima Concezione». 
 Saint Onuphrius, Quadreria dei Girolamini.
 Adoration of the Shepherds, oil on canvas, Museo civico Gaetano Filangieri.
 Adoration of the Shepherds, St Catherine of Siena chapel, basilica di San Domenico Maggiore.

Piedmont

Turin
 Adoration of the Shepherds, oil on canvas, Palazzo Reale
 Samson Arrested, Pinacoteca Reale of the Galleria Sabauda

Rome
 1630, Sampson and Delilah, oil on canvas, Gallerie nazionali d'arte antica, Palazzo Barberini 
 1632 – 1633, Beheading of St John the Baptist, oil on canvas Gallerie nazionali d'arte antica, Palazzo Barberini.
 Jesus Arrested, Galleria Spada

Tuscany

Florence
 Annunciation, produced in Naples, acquired by the Uffizi

Malta 

 Death of Cato, MUŻA, La Valletta.

France 

 Pilate Washing His Hands, c. 1650 and Isaac blessing Jacob, Musée du Louvre, Paris
Saint Ambrose, 1633-1639, Saint John and Saint Mark, Musee des Beaux-Arts de Rennes
Saint Jerome and Adoration of the Shepherds, Musee des Beaux-Arts de Nantes
Supper at Emmaus and Avarice, Grenoble Museum
Adoration of the Magi, Musee des Augustins, Toulouse
Adoration of the Magi, Musee des Beaux-Arts de Rouen 
King David, Musee des Beaux-Arts de Marseille
 Sarah presented by Agar to Abraham, Musée Condé, Chantilly.
 Sacrifice of Isaac, Musée Fesch, Ajaccio
The Good Samaritan, Musée des Hospices civils de Lyon
Jesus and Nicodemus, Dax Cathedral

Spain 

 The Incredulity of Saint Thomas, Museo del Prado, Madrid
The Supper at Emmaus, Thyssen-Bornemisza Museum, Madrid.
Saint Sebastian tended by Saint Irene and a Maid, Museo de Bellas Artes de Valencia, Valencia.

Sweden 
 A Young Man Reading by Candlelight and Adoration of the Magi, Nationalmuseum, Stockholm

United Kingdom
Salome receives the Head of John the Baptist, National Gallery, London

United States
Adoration of the Shepherds, North Carolina Museum of Art, Raleigh, North Carolina
The Judgement of Solomon, Museum of Fine Arts, Houston, Texas
The Judgement of Solomon, Currier Museum of Art, Manchester, New Hampshire

References

Stom, Matthias